Sixto Escobar (March 23, 1913 – November 17, 1979) was a Puerto Rican professional boxer. Competing in the bantamweight division, he became Puerto Rico's first world champion.

Escobar was born in Barceloneta and raised in San Juan. There he received his primary education and took interest in boxing. After gathering a record of 21–1–1 as an amateur, Escobar debuted as a professional in 1931 defeating Luis "Kid Dominican" Pérez by knockout. Early in his career, he moved to Venezuela due to the lack of opponents in his division. There he received an opportunity for the Venezuelan Bantamweight championship, but lost by points to Enrique Chaffardet. Subsequently, he moved to New York and began boxing in other states, eventually capturing the Montreal Athletic Commission World Bantamweight Title. In 1936, he defeated Tony Marino to unify this championship with the one recognized by the International Boxing Union, in the process becoming the third Latin American undisputed world boxing champion. After retiring, he worked as a spokesperson for beer companies in New York, before returning to Puerto Rico in the 1960s, where he resided until his death. He received several posthumous recognitions and his name was used in several sports venues and buildings. In 2002, Escobar was inducted into the International Boxing Hall of Fame.

Early life and amateur career
Escobar was born in Barrio Palmas Altas, a sector of Barceloneta, Puerto Rico, to Jacinto Escobar and Adela Vargas. Early in his life, he moved to Tras Talleres in Santurce, a subsection of San Juan, Puerto Rico. There he received his elementary and secondary education, up until the seventh grade, when he decided to dedicate himself full-time to his sports career. In Tras Talleres, he began developing an interest in boxing and received instruction in said discipline. Although at this time, boxing was illegal in Puerto Rico; remote places such as a house's backyard or rooftops were used to organize clandestine fights without attracting attention from the local police. In 1928, a Puerto Rican boxer named Ángel "Sotito" Soto moved from New York to a house near the Escobar family's residence and established a gym in his backyard. There he gave boxing classes to Escobar and several other young athletes. After several months of instruction, Soto prepared a boxing card with included three-round fights, in which each round lasted two minutes. In this event, Escobar earned his first victory, defeating a pugilist identified as "Gombar" by knockout in the first round. After this match, Escobar continued fighting in clandestine gyms. He met and was received by Ignacio Peñagaricano, the owner of Victoria Gym. Escobar received his boxing license through Peñagaricano. On February 16, 1927, governor Horace Mann Towner legalized boxing and allowed the establishment of organized boxing matches. Professionals would fight Fridays, Saturdays and Sundays which, were considered the best days of the week, while amateurs could compete the remaining days of the week without limitations. As an amateur, he fought in 23 combats, gathering a record of 21 wins, one loss and a draw. His draw was against Ramón Rodríguez of San Lorenzo and his only loss was in the hands of Pedro Montañez from Cayey, in a fight that took place in March 1930.

Professional career
Escobar turned professional on September 1, 1930, in a fight card organized at the Victory Garden gym in San Juan. In this event, he defeated Luis "Kid Dominican" Pérez, who entered the fight as the Dominican Republic's champion, by knockout in the third round. In Puerto Rico, Escobar fought in 15 contests, before moving to Venezuela after the popularity of professional boxing declined in his home country. This move was motivated by Roberto Andrade, who provided transportation to the country. In Venezuela, he fought in Caracas, competing against José Lugo, Sindulfo Díaz, Rafael "Moralito" Morales, Pica Pica and Simón Chávez among others. On November 11, 1931, Escobar competed against Enrique Chaffardet for the Venezuelan Bantamweight Title, but lost by decision. After 17 fights, he returned to Puerto Rico and competed in five cards. But professional boxing suffered another decline in interest, which forced Escobar to work as an accommodator in baseball games three days of the week, generally on weekends. In the meanwhile, Tony Rojas, a friend of his managers Gustavo Jiménez and Arturo Gigante, convinced them to release Escobar of the contract which bound them. Since Escobar turned professional while he was still legally a minor, his father had to sign the unbinding agreement. After succeeding in this task, Rojas presented Escobar with a steam boat ticket to New York, which covered his food, clothes and hotel expenses. Escobar reached New York in early 1934, intending to "obtain fame and honor" for "[his] motherland", there he was received by Rojas and professional trainer Whitey Bimstein. His first fight in the United States took place at the Valley Arena in Holyoke, Massachusetts on May 7, 1934. In this contest he was paired against Canadian bantamweight titleholder Bobby Leitham, defeating him by technical knockout in the seventh round.

Escobar's manager, Lou Brix and his trainer recognized that Escobar could be close to a championship fight once the incumbent, Panamian Alfonso Teófilo Brown, refused to defend the championship against the first contender, which led to it being stripped by the National Boxing Association (NBA). A rematch was then organized against Leitham. This was an eliminatory card organized by the Montreal Athletic Commission, which was to determine a contender for their vacant Bantamweight World Championship, against first contender Baby Casanova, who attended the card. After scoring three knockdowns in the fourth round, Escobar connected another punch that injured Leitham, after which Leitham's manager surrendered the fight. This marked Leitham's last fight. Following this result, the NBA immediately called for a fight between Escobar and Casanova. By this time he had gained a reputation as a quick and technical boxer, capable of gathering quick knockouts with body punches if confronted by an unprepared opponent. The fight took place on June 26, 1934, and it was organized in Montreal, Quebec, Canada. Escobar scored a knockdown in the third round; the fight concluded in the ninth round when Casanova lost by knockout. With this win, Escobar won the Montreal Athletic Commission World Bantamweight Title, thus becoming the first Puerto Rican to win a world boxing championship title. This had a significant impact on Puerto Rico, where it was constantly discussed by the general public. Songs, decimas and poetry were written about this accomplishment. However, the New York State Athletic Commission (NYSAC) and International Boxing Union (IBU) of France didn't recognize the outcome of this fight, conserving Tony Marino and Brown as their recognized champions.

Undisputed world bantamweight title
On August 8, 1934, he defeated Eugene Hart by points in a non-title match organized in Canada. This was the first time in his career that Escobar completed a 15-round contest. After this event, he stayed in Montreal expecting to fight against the winner of a matchup between Louis Salica and Bobby Quintana, which was scheduled to take place on December of that year. However, Escobar was forced to cancel his plans after suffering a heel injury when he was hit by a car. He spent a month in inactivity while recovering, and in the winter he returned to Puerto Rico. The governor ordered to have all government buildings closed so that public employees could attend a welcoming ceremony. The event, which took place in Old San Juan's dock, was followed by a parade. Upon arriving in Barceloneta, Escobar was recognized as a "predilect son" of that municipality by the city's mayor, which was followed by a week of festivities in his name. Escobar pursued a fight with Brown, but his offers were refused while the Panamanian pugilist promoted a campaign protesting the removal of his recognition as champion, demanding to be reinstated.

On August 7, 1935, Escobar defeated Pete Sanstol—who once held, in 1931, the Canadian Boxing Federation and Montreal Athletic Commission (MAC) world bantamweight titles—by unanimous decision in 12 rounds. However, Escobar still wasn't considered the division's Undisputed Champion because Balthazar Sangchili had defeated Panama Al Brown and was recognized by the IBU. Due to this, Sanstol sent a letter to the NYSAC noting that the fight was of eliminatory nature, even though it was recognized as a titular contest by the NBA and MAC. Wanting to be recognized as such, Escobar pursued a title unification fight against Tony Marino, who had defeated Sangchili by knockout in his previous fight. He won the fight by knockout in the tenth round, receiving the "undisputed world champion" 
distinction. On November 13, 1935, Escobar became the first Puerto Rican to win a title fight in the first round, defeating "Indian" Quintana by knockout.

This outcome made it possible to organize a fight against Louis Salica, it was the first time that Escobar fought a title fight in Puerto Rico. The card was promoted by Arturo Gigante and Gustavo Jiménez Sicardó. Escobar won the fight by unanimous decision, while Jack Dempsey served as referee. He participated in Mike Jacobs's "Carnival of Champions" on September 23, 1937 and lost the title to Harry Jeffra by unanimous decision. Shortly after, he recovered from this loss and he returned to the gym; he defeated Johnny Defoe in a preparatory contest. On February 20, 1938, Escobar faced Jeffra in a rematch organized at the El Escambrón baseball park in Puerta de Tierra. He won the contest by unanimous decision, scoring three knockdowns. This became an early example of fights that attracted the attention and criticism of boxing analysts, particularly those in New York.  On April 2, 1939, Escobar defeated Kayo Morgan before a sold-out crowd of 15,000 at the Estadio Sixto Escobar, which had been inaugurated three years earlier. After this fight, he received The Ring Bantamweight Championship, which was presented by the magazine's editor, Nat Fleischer. Later in 1939, Escobar received a draft notice from the United States Army, ordering him to take a physical exam for possible military service. He and his manager presented the issue to the Puerto Rico Boxing Commission, managing to receive a postponement of two months before surrendering his title. On April 6, 1940, Escobar fought Simón Chávez for ten rounds in what ended as a draw. Escobar then fought some short non-title fights, of which he lost four, all by points. On December 2, 1940, Escobar participated in his last professional fight, losing to a ten-round decision to Harry Jeffra. Throughout his career Escobar avoided being knocked down or out in any fight, all of his losses being by decision. In April 1941, he was drafted to the United States Army and participated in World War II.

Retirement, death and legacy

After his military service, Escobar confronted problems to meet the bantamweight's limit and retired. He became a spokesman for a liquor brand and relocated to New York temporally, with his family. Subsequently, he returned to Puerto Rico where he worked selling liquor in bars. In May 1947, Escobar and Jiménez Sicardó co-promoted a fight with the intention of bringing fans back to boxing. In the main event, Diego Sosa was matched against Francisco Colón García. Escobar was inducted into the Madison Square Garden's Boxing Hall of Fame in 1950. Escobar continued in his job as a liquor salesperson, during which it was common for liquor salesmen to drink a little bit of the product which they sold in front of potential customers.  This contributed to the development of Escobar's alcoholic tendencies. His alcoholism would later combine with his diabetes and contribute to his death when he was 66 years old. Weeks before his death, Escobar participated in his last ceremony, where Diego Suárez, president of V. Suárez & Company. gave him a recognition.

After his death, the town of Barceloneta honored his memory by a statue. His remains are interred at Cementerio Municipal Viejo in Barceloneta, according to a memorial written to honor his life. Escobar became the first world boxing champion in history to have a statue in his honor. On June 9, 2002, Escobar was inducted into the International Boxing Hall of Fame. He became the fourth Puerto Rican to receive this distinction and the first to be included in the "Old Timers" section. In March 2005, a second statue of Estobar was unveiled at the Estadio Sixto Escobar in San Juan. Among the celebrities that attended the ceremony were former boxing world champions Julian Solís and Alfredo Escalera. This statue's location served as a remembrance tribute during the 94th anniversary of Escobar's birth, when a flower crown was placed at its feet.  During this date, an activity was presented by Puerto Rico's House of Boxing in the library of the Pabellón de la Fama del Deporte Puertorriqueño. Among those who attended the ceremony  were Solís, Escalera and Iván Calderón. On this date, People Inc. presented a documentary covering his life, which was donated to the venue. Several buildings and streets were named after Escobar posthumously, including the Auditorio Sixto Escobar. The house where he lived was later turned into a library and museum bearing his name.

Professional boxing record

See also
List of bantamweight boxing champions
List of Puerto Rican boxing world champions
 Sports in Puerto Rico
Undisputed Champion

References

Sources

External links

Sixto Escobar – CBZ Profile

 https://titlehistories.com/boxing/wba/wba-world-b.html
 https://titlehistories.com/boxing/na/usa/ny/nysac-b.html
 https://boxrec.com/media/index.php/The_Ring_Magazine%27s_Annual_Ratings:_Bantamweight--1930s

1913 births
1979 deaths
People from Barceloneta, Puerto Rico
Bantamweight boxers
History of Puerto Rico
International Boxing Hall of Fame inductees
Puerto Rican Army personnel
Puerto Rican male boxers
United States Army personnel of World War II